Oropos is a small town and a municipality in East Attica, Greece.

The village of Skala Oropou, within the bounds of the municipality, was the site an important ancient Greek city, Oropus, and the famous nearby sanctuary of Amphiaraos is stll visible today.

Geography

The municipality Oropos stretches between the Parnitha mountains and the South Euboean Gulf, opposite Eretria (on the island Euboea). The town Oropos, the seat of the municipality, is situated on the lower course of the river Asopos, 4 km south of the coast. It lies 4 km southwest of Nea Palatia and 55 km north of Athens city center. The community Oropos consists of the town Oropos and the nearby villages Kampos and Platania. The municipality has an area of 338.183 km2, the community 11.967 km2.

Municipality
The present municipality Oropos was formed at the 2011 local government reform by the merger of the following 9 former municipalities, that became municipal units (constituent communities in brackets):
Afidnes
Avlonas
Kalamos
Kapandriti
Malakasa
Markopoulo Oropou
Oropioi (Nea Palatia, Skala Oropou and Oropos)
Polydendri
Sykamino

History

Oropos was founded by colonists from Eretria; it was either located in or identical with Graea. In ancient times, it was a border city between Boeotia and Attica, and its possession was a continual cause of dispute between the two states; but ultimately it came into possession of Athens, and was always an Attic town, even during the Roman Empire. The actual harbour, which was called Delphinium, was at the mouth of the Asopus, about a mile (1.6 km) north of the city.

The famous Sanctuary of Amphiaraos was situated in the territory of Oropus, 12 stadia from the city. The site has been excavated by the Greek Archaeological Society; it contained a temple, a sacred spring, into which coins were thrown by worshippers, altars and porticoes, and a small theatre, of which the proskenion is well preserved. Worshippers used to consult the oracle of Amphiaraos by sleeping on the skin of a slaughtered ram within the sacred building.
The village of Oropos has historically been settled by Arvanites.

During the Regime of the Colonels renowned composer Mikis Theodorakis was interned in the concentration camp at Oropos before going into exile in Paris.

See also
List of settlements in Attica

References

External links
GTP Travel Pages (Community)
 Museum "O Phaeton"
Ferry boats Oropos-Eretria

 
Municipalities of Attica
Populated places in East Attica
Arvanite settlements